Ludwig Sjöholm (born 18 June 1990) is a bass guitarist and songwriter from Sweden, who plays in the heavy metal band Ambush.

References

1990 births
Living people
Swedish heavy metal bass guitarists
21st-century bass guitarists